The 1940 National Invitation Tournament was the 1940 edition of the annual NCAA college basketball competition.

Selected teams
Below is a list of the six teams selected for the tournament.

 Colorado
 DePaul
 Duquesne
 Long Island
 Oklahoma A&M
 St. John's

Bracket
Below is the tournament bracket.

See also
 1940 NCAA basketball tournament
 1940 NAIA Division I men's basketball tournament

References

National Invitation
National Invitation Tournament
1940s in Manhattan
National Invitation Tournament
National Invitation Tournament
College sports tournaments in New York City
Basketball competitions in New York City
Sports in Manhattan